Staines Bridge is a road bridge running in a south-west to north-east direction across the River Thames in Surrey. It is on the modern A308 road and links the boroughs of Spelthorne and Runnymede at Staines-upon-Thames and Egham Hythe. The bridge is Grade II listed.

The bridge crosses the Thames on the reach between Penton Hook Lock and Bell Weir Lock, and is close to and upstream of the main mouth of the River Colne, a tributary. The bridge carries the Thames Path across the river.

Its forebear built in Roman Britain, the bridge has been bypassed by three arterial routes, firstly in 1961 by the Runnymede Bridge near Wraysbury and in the 1970s by the building of the UK motorway network (specifically near Maidenhead and Chertsey). Owing to the commercial centres of the town in Spelthorne and of Egham, the bridge has had peak hour queues since at least the 1930s.

History
In Roman times, Staines lay on the Devil's Highway, an important road connecting the provincial capital Londinium (London) with points west via Calleva Atrebatum (Silchester). The site's Latin name was Pontes ("The Bridges"), implying that there was more than one bridge. It is believed that these bridges traversed Church Island.

A wooden bridge was referenced as early as 1228, and  required regular repair. It was put out of use during the Civil War. Under an act of 1791, a stone bridge was built a little way downstream of the old one, the latter being retained. The central arch of this bridge cracked almost immediately and a third bridge – but of iron – was completed in 1803. This failed and a fourth bridge, also of iron was opened in 1807. The old wooden bridge, which had continued in service, was then pulled down. The fifth and present bridge with three arches in white granite was designed by George Rennie. Construction started in 1827, and it was opened in 1832.

From the 1940s until the 1970s this was a hotspot for summer holiday traffic jams due to many motorists heading from London towards the south-west. When the M3 and later the M25 bridges were constructed, the traffic was diverted away from the town.

In literature 

In his Arthurian novel Enemy of God Bernard Cornwell sites an 11-arch stone bridge at Pontes/Staines. He attributes it 7 arches over the river with two on land at each end. A the Western end is a tower over the road from Calleva, which bears a plaque commemorating its building by Emperor Hadrian. At the Eastern end an earth-walled settlement.

Roman Road
The Roman Road does not have a popular name, but a straight line road route from Staines to London Wall can clearly be traced on modern maps via the A30, A315, A402 and Oxford Street. It passes through modern Hounslow, Brentford, Kensington and Holborn, interrupted only by a stretch of the District line between Gunnersbury and Turnham Green. An early Saxon route from The Strand out of the City via Charing Cross in northern Westminster supplemented this and became a rival road from the city to Staines Bridge. The route west of Staines is known as the Devil's Highway, and it runs in a straight course to the Roman settlement Calleva Atrebatum in the parish of Silchester. The Saxons abandoned Calleva, building their own village centre nearby.

See also
Crossings of the River Thames
Roman road from London to Bath

External links
 Thames path at Staines

References

Bridges across the River Thames
Roman roads in England
Road bridges in England
Bridges in Surrey
Rebuilt buildings and structures in the United Kingdom
Bridges completed in 1832
Archaeological sites in Surrey
Staines-upon-Thames